Anthony Murray (died 16 May 2006) was a New Zealand rugby league footballer and coach who played professionally for Wigan.

Playing career
Murray played for the Takahiwai Warriors alongside his twin brother, Thomas. During the 1980–81 Rugby Football League season, Murray played for the Wigan club and made two appearances off the bench.

Murray was a Northland and Northern Districts representative and played for the New Zealand Māori, touring Britain in 1983 and competing in the 1986 Pacific Cup.

Coaching career
Murray coached Northland in 1991 and 1992.

Later years
Murray was later influential, along with Harry Clyde, in getting the Northern Storm accepted into the 2006 Bartercard Cup.

Personal life 
Murray belonged to the Ngāti Haua subtribe of the Te Rarawa iwi (Māori tribe).

Murray collapsed and died on 16 May 2006 aged 46. The Northern Storm's first win, 40-22 against Wellington on the following weekend, was dedicated to Murray.

References

1959 births
2006 deaths
New Zealand rugby league coaches
New Zealand rugby league players
New Zealand Māori rugby league players
New Zealand Māori rugby league team players
Northern Districts rugby league team players
Northland rugby league team coaches
Northland rugby league team players
Rugby league players from Northland Region
Rugby league props
Te Rarawa people
Wigan Warriors players